May Fourth Square is a large (10 hectares) public square in Qingdao's central business district.  It is located between the new municipal government building and Fushan Bay and is composed of Shizhengting Square, the central square and the coastal park. Named after the nationwide protest May Fourth Movement that started in Qingdao, the square is best recognized by the large "May Wind" sculpture near the seaside. The square is a popular tourist destination, and is bordered by the city government to the north, the sea to the south. The eastern and western sides of the square are surrounded by high-rise buildings.

On September 25th, 2018, the light show to celebrate Chinese Mid-autumn festival was put on the buildings across the sea of the May Fourth Square.

History of May Fourth Square 
The May 4th Movement was sparked by Article 156 of the Treaty of Versailles which transferred German concessions in Shandong including Qingdao to Japan rather than returning sovereign authority to China. Chinese outrage over this provision ignited mass student demonstrations in Beijing on May 4th, 1919 which resulted in the cultural movement known today as the May Fourth Movement. The May 4th Movement influenced the Chinese delegation not to sign the Treaty of Versailles. China declared the end of its war against Germany in September 1919 and signed a separate treaty in 1921.

After the completion of the May Fourth Square, it has become the main cultural landscape of the eastern new urban area. China Central Television and other units filmed special programs with May Fourth Square in the background, especially with the "May Wind" theme sculpture, to commemorate the 80th anniversary of the May Fourth Movement.

Layout 
The plant layout of May Fourth Square is mainly based on the evergreen cold-season lawn, with small cypress, pine, albizia, golden privet, turtle early holly , purple leaf barberry, floribunda rose and other flowers and trees. 

May Fourth Square is divided into north and south areas. The north area is connected to the Qingdao Municipal People's Government and is the central square. The southern district is adjacent to Fushan Bay and is the district Liangxin Beach Park. In the middle of the square there is a large green lawn with palm trees. The surrounding area of the square and the lawn are tightly paved with various patterns with Qingdao granite, and a circular fountain is located in the center.

References

Tourist attractions in Qingdao
Squares in Qingdao